The 2012–13 UCI Africa Tour was the ninth season of the UCI Africa Tour. The season began on 3 October 2012 with the Grand Prix Chantal Biya and ended on 12 May 2013 with the Trophée de la Maison Royale.

The points leader, based on the cumulative results of previous races, wears the UCI Africa Tour cycling jersey. Tarik Chaoufi of Morocco was the defending champion of the 2011–12 UCI Africa Tour. Adil Jelloul of Morocco was crowned as the 2012–13 UCI Africa Tour champion.

Throughout the season, points are awarded to the top finishers of stages within stage races and the final general classification standings of each of the stages races and one-day events. The quality and complexity of a race also determines how many points are awarded to the top finishers, the higher the UCI rating of a race, the more points are awarded.
The UCI ratings from highest to lowest are as follows:
 Multi-day events: 2.HC, 2.1 and 2.2
 One-day events: 1.HC, 1.1 and 1.2

Events

2012

2013

Final standings

Individual classification

Team classification

Nation classification

Nation under-23 classification

External links
 

UCI Africa Tour
Africa Tour
Africa Tour
UCI Africa Tour
UCI Africa Tour